John William Garvin (1859–1935) was a Canadian publisher and teacher in Toronto, Ontario. He was also the husband of the writer known as Katherine Hale, the pen name of Amelia Beers Warnock.

Garvin was a prolific editor and published numerous literary anthologies.

References 
Entry for Katharine Hale in Garvin's own Canadian Poets from 1916.

Selected works 
Garvin, J. W. (ed): The collected poems of Isabella Valancy Crawford, Toronto: W. Briggs, 1905. With an introduction by Ethelwyn Wetherald.
Garvin, J. W. (ed): Canadian Poets, Toronto, Ontario, Canada: McClelland, Goodchild & Stewart, Publishers, 1916; with a second, updated edition 1926.
Garvin, J. W. (ed): Wanderings of an Artist: Among the Indians of North America, The Radisson Socienty of Canada Ltd, Toronto, 1925. A republication of Paul Kane's original travel account from 1859 with an introduction by Lawrence J. Burpee.
Garvin, J. W. (ed): Voyages from Montreal on the river St. Laurence through the continent of North America to the frozen and Pacific Oceans in the years 1789 and 1793 : with a preliminary account of the rise, progress, and present state of the fur trade of that country by Alexander MacKenzie, The Radisson Socienty of Canada Ltd, Toronto, 1927.

Garvin, John William
Garvin, John William
Garvin, John William